The Trigno (Latin Trinius) is an  Italian river. It originates in the Apennine Mountains, in the province of Isernia and flows into the Adriatic Sea near Vasto. It also forms the border between the regions Abruzzo and Molise.

See also
 Barbara Line

Rivers of the Province of Campobasso
Rivers of the Province of Chieti
Rivers of the Province of Isernia
Rivers of Italy
Adriatic Italian coast basins